Leonard Carow (born 26 June 1994) is a German actor. He has appeared in several German television films and series, and in Steven Spielberg's 2011 film, War Horse.

Filmography

Cinema
2014 Who Am I, MRX
2011 War Horse, Michael
2011  (German title: Die Relativitätstheorie der Liebe), Hanno

Television
2008 Sklaven und Herren (TV movie), Klaus Pohl
2008 Polizeiruf 110 (TV series), Tim Bachmeier
2004-2007 Tatort (TV series), Timmy Stemmler
2007 Mondkalb, Tom Hatzky
2006 Ich leih mir eine Familie (TV movie), Paul
2006 Unsere zehn Gebote (TV series), Leon
2006 Geile Zeiten (TV movie), Josh
2005 SOKO Wismar (TV series), Junge
2005 Mord am Meer (TV movie), Felix Glauberg
2004 Typisch Mann! (TV series), Philip Wolf
2004 Operation Valkyrie (TV movie), Heimeran v. Stauffenberg (uncredited)

Awards
In 2017, Carow was awarded a Goldene Kamera as best young professional of the year.

References

External links

 Talent agency (German)

1994 births
German male child actors
German male film actors
German male television actors
Living people